Cotyadesmus is a genus of longhorn beetles of the subfamily Lamiinae, containing the following species:

 Cotyadesmus brunneus (Aurivillius, 1923)
 Cotyadesmus iuba (Galileo & Martins, 2003)

References

Hemilophini